Tyler Ardron (born 16 June 1991) is a Canadian rugby union player who plays for Canada nationally and Castres in the Top 14. Ardron plays in the back-row but is also capable of providing cover in the second row. Ardron made his debut for the Canada national rugby union team against the United States during the 2012 Summer Internationals and has captained the team since 2013, notably at the World Cup in 2015 and 2019. In 2017 it was announced that Ardron had signed with the Super Rugby side the Chiefs for the 2018 season and Bay of Plenty for the 2017 Mitre 10 Cup season.

Club career

It was announced on 8 June 2013 that Ardron would be joining the Ospreys for the 2013-2014 RaboDirect Pro12 season.

Ardron made his first appearance for the Ospreys on 14 September 2013. Coming off the bench, Ardron played for 26 minutes against Leinster.

It was announced in mid 2017 that Ardron had signed for the Chiefs in Super Rugby for 2018 and Bay of Plenty in the Mitre 10 Cup for 2017.

On 4 June 2020, it was announced that Ardron would be making the switch to Castres Olympique in the French TOP 14

References

External links
 

1991 births
Living people
Canadian rugby union players
Rugby union locks
Canada international rugby union players
Canada international rugby sevens players
Rugby union flankers
Rugby union number eights
Ospreys (rugby union) players
Bay of Plenty rugby union players
Chiefs (rugby union) players
Castres Olympique players